Sahasame Naa Oopiri is a 1989 Indian Telugu satirical crime film based on the murder of the political leader Vangaveeti Mohana Ranga. The film directed by Vijaya Nirmala features Krishna alongside herself, Naresh, Vani Vishwanath and Gummadi in the lead roles. Vijaya Nirmala also wrote the screenplay for a story by P. Chandrasekhara Reddy while Tripuraneni Maharathi penned the dialogues. Vidyasagar scored and composed the film's soundtrack while Adurthi Haranath edited the film and Lakshman Gore handled the cinematography.

Cast 
 Krishna Ghattamaneni
 Vijaya Nirmala
 Naresh
 Vani Viswanath 
 Gummadi
 Giribabu
 Ranganath
 Kota Srinivasa Rao
 Bob Christo
 Radha Ravi
 Rajesh

Soundtrack

Release 
The film was released on 25 May 1989. It was released when the cold war between Krishna and actor-politician and the then Chief Minister of Andhra Pradesh, NTR, reached its peak. The film emphasised on how NTR might have played a role in the brutal murder of the then rising political leader Vangaveeti Mohana Ranga as alleged by a few newspapers and the latter's political party at that time. Hence, the film garnered generally mixed reviews. Nevertheless, the film turned out to be a money spinner at the box office and ended up as a commercially safe venture. The film had a direct run of 50 days in a few centres, with 4 of them being from the Ceded region which was surprisingly high for a Krishna film and 100 days run in Guntur.

Reference

Source 
 Sahasame Naa Oopiri

1989 films
Indian crime action films
1980s Telugu-language films
1980s crime action films
Films directed by Vijaya Nirmala